The Didact is the self-produced debut album by Swedish progressive metal band, Means End, released in 2013. The album name "The Didact" derives from the Ancient Greek word, "didaktikós", meaning to instruct or be taught.

Musical and lyrical style
The album contains intellectual and philosophical lyrics about numerous topics and melds them together as the lines between humanity and technology are thinned. The instrumentation incorporates electronic choirs, polyrhythmic riffs, jazz-influenced bass lines, and dynamic vocals among many other things. The album also features a linear tempo rendition of Nox Aurumque, originally composed by Eric Whitacre.

Track listing

Personnel
Robert Luciani –  lead vocals
Rasmus Hemse –  bass
Christian Schreil –  drums
Leonard Östlund –  guitar

Acle Kahney (member of Tesseract, ex-Fellsilent), of 4D studios, mixed and mastered this album.

References 

"Robert Luciani Vocalist of Means End on the Big Plantation 03.16.14." YouTube. YouTube, 13 Mar. 14. Web. 26 Sept. 2014.
Mike. "MEANS END EP (FREE MUSIC!)." The Circle Pit. N.p., 26 Dec. 2012. Web. 26 Sept. 2014.
Benanne. "Discography for Means End." Got Djent? N.p., 31 Aug. 2011. Web. 26 Sept. 2014.

External links 
 The Didact Progarchives page

Means End albums
2013 albums